The Lockheed CL-288 was a conceptual interceptor aircraft based on the Lockheed F-104 Starfighter, powered by two wing-mounted engines.

References

Lockheed aircraft
1950s United States fighter aircraft